Greek Tragedy and the British Theatre 1660–1914 is a non-fiction book authored by Edith Hall and Fiona Macintosh. It was published on 15 September 2015 by the Oxford University Press. Chronological coverage is from the British Restoration to the early twentieth century.

See also

The Cambridge History of British Theatre
 London theatre closure 1642
 King's Men § Aftermath for the history of one company affected by the prohibition
 William Robbins an actor who lost his living, and fought and died for the Royalist cause.
 Antitheatricality 16th and 17th century
 English Renaissance theatre
 Theatre of Scotland

References

External links

Cultural history of the United Kingdom
Theatre in the United Kingdom
Theatre in Scotland
Theatre in Ireland
Textual criticism